Siskiwit Lake is the largest lake on Isle Royale in Lake Superior.  in area, the lake has cold, clear water which is relatively low in nutrients. Tributaries include the Little Siskiwit River, and the lake's outlet is the Siskiwit River which flows into Lake Superior.

Siskiwit Lake is available for fishing, with restrictions (no motorized boats, no natural bait). Lake Trout, Brook Trout, Rainbow Trout, and Yellow Perch are found in the lake. A 2004 study of toxaphene concentrations found that concentrations were lower in Siskiwit Lake trout than in Lake Superior trout, possibly due to shorter food chains and greater reliance on zooplankton or other pelagic invertebrates.

Siskiwit Lake contains several lake islands, including Eagle Nest Island, Teakettle Island, Lost and Found Island, and Ryan Island. Common loons nest and breed on some of these islands.

Siskiwit Lake and Ryan Island were together part of the subject of the Moose Boulder hoax, which claimed that a boulder existed in the seasonal pond of Moose Flats on Ryan Island in Siskiwit Lake. This would have made Moose Boulder the largest known island in a lake on an island in a lake on an island in a lake. In 2020 Moose Boulder was reported to be a hoax.

See also
List of lakes in Michigan
Recursive islands and lakes

References

Siskiwit
Bodies of water of Keweenaw County, Michigan
Isle Royale